Mullah Najibullah Rafi is an Afghan Taliban politician who is currently serving as Governor of Nimruz Province since 7 November 2021.

References

Living people
Taliban governors
Governors of Nimruz Province
Year of birth missing (living people)